Meza meza, the common missile, is a butterfly in the family Hesperiidae. It is found in Senegal, Guinea-Bissau, Guinea, Sierra Leone, Liberia, Ivory Coast, Ghana, Togo, Nigeria, Cameroon, Angola, the Democratic Republic of the Congo and Uganda. The habitat consists of disturbed and successional forests.

Adults are attracted to flowers.

The larvae feed on Paspalum conjugatum.

References

Butterflies described in 1877
Erionotini
Butterflies of Africa
Taxa named by William Chapman Hewitson